The 1952 Swiss motorcycle Grand Prix was the first race of the 1952 Motorcycle Grand Prix season. It took place on 17–18 May 1952 at the Bremgarten circuit.

500 cc classification

350 cc classification

250 cc classification

Sidecar classification

References

Swiss motorcycle Grand Prix
Swiss motorcycle Grand Prix
Motorcycle Grand Prix